Willer Bordon (16 January 1949 – 14 July 2015) was an Italian academic, businessman and politician who served in different cabinet posts at the end of the 1990s and 2000s.

Early life
Bordon was born in Muggia, Province of Trieste, on 16 January 1949.

Career
Bordon was the mayor of Muggia for eleven years. In 1987, he was elected to the Italian parliament, being a deputy for Trieste. He founded Democratic Alliance, a small centre-left party, in 1992. He resigned from the party in June 1994 following the poor achievement in the general election. Later he joined the Margherita party. From 1998 to 1999 he served as the minister for public works. He was appointed minister of environment to the cabinet led by Prime Minister Giuliano Amato in April 2000. Bordon replaced Edo Ronchi as minister of environment.

Bordon also served as the member of the Italian Senate. In 2008 Bordon retired from the Senate. After leaving politics, he became the president of the Enalg SpA. In addition, he also began to work as a professor of political science at La Sapienza University.

Death
Bordon died at the age of 66 on 14 July 2015.

References

External links

21st-century Italian businesspeople
1949 births
2015 deaths
Democratic Party of the Left politicians
Democratic Alliance (Italy) politicians
Democratic Union (Italy) politicians
Italian political party founders
Italian Communist Party politicians
Italy of Values politicians
The Democrats (Italy) politicians
Democracy is Freedom – The Daisy politicians
Environment ministers of Italy
Mayors of places in Friuli-Venezia Giulia
Deputies of Legislature X of Italy
Members of the Senate of the Republic (Italy)
People from Muggia
Radical Party (Italy) politicians
Academic staff of the Sapienza University of Rome
Italian Ministers of Public Works